Eavesdropping on the Songs of Whales is the fifth album by South African rock band The Parlotones. It was released on 13 June 2011 by Sovereign Entertainment. It is their first acoustic collection of previously released songs, re-recorded at a studio in South Africa.

It contains two previously unreleased songs, including the radio single "It's Magic". The album art is an adaptation of Neil Pauw's paintings.

Track listing

Personnel
Kahn Morbee – lead vocals, rhythm guitar
Paul Hodgson – lead guitar
Glen Hodgson – bass guitar, backing vocals
Neil Pauw – drums
Philip Nolte, Jacques Bezuidenhout, Zamani Nxumalo, Garth Payne, Johan Gous, Lwando Sirenya, Sifiso Masemola, Themba Shabalala - soloists

References

2011 albums
The Parlotones albums